Frank James Dixon (March 9, 1920 – February 8, 2008) was an biomedical researcher, best known for his research into diseases of the immune system that can damage other organs of the body. Dixon was also noted for having developed techniques involving trace iodines to study proteins.

Born in St. Paul, Dixon received his bachelor's degree and M.D. from the University of Minnesota.  He joined the United States Navy in 1943, after completing his M.D.  Dixon was a co-founder and director of the Scripps Research Institute in San Diego.

In 1981, Dixon became a founding member of the World Cultural Council.

Awards
 Gairdner Foundation International Award, 1969
 Lasker Award, 1975
 Dickson Prize in Medicine, 1976
 Rous-Whipple Award, 1979
 Member, United States National Academy of Sciences

References

Further reading
 "Frank J. Dixon, La Jolla pioneer, dies Feb. 8", La Jolla Light, Feb. 13, 2008.

External links
National Academy of Sciences Biographical Memoir

1920 births
2008 deaths
University of Minnesota Medical School alumni
American immunologists
Scripps Research faculty
Recipients of the Albert Lasker Award for Basic Medical Research
Founding members of the World Cultural Council
Members of the United States National Academy of Sciences
United States Navy personnel of World War II